The Naked Communist is a 1958 anti-communist book by W. Cleon Skousen, a former FBI employee. The book has been reprinted several times and it has sold more than one million copies.

Content 
The Naked Communist is a 1958 anti-communist book by American faith-based political theorist W. Cleon Skousen, a former FBI employee.  The main subject of the book is an alleged communist plot to overcome and control all of the world's governments through the implementation of social progressivism and by undermining American foreign policy through the promotion of internationalism and pacifism. The early chapters of the book cover the philosophy of Marxism and Soviet Communism as well as some of the history of communist power in various countries including the Soviet Union and Cuba.

Reception
The book has been reprinted several times—most recently in a 2017 printing through Izzard Ink Publishing—and it has sold more than one million copies. The book has been highly discussed by American conservatives Glenn Beck and Ben Carson, the latter of whom stated, "The Naked Communist lays out the whole progressive plan. It is unbelievable how fast it has been achieved." In 1963, a portion of the book was read into the United States Congressional Record.

References

External links 
 

1958 non-fiction books
History books about communism
History books about socialism
20th-century history books
History books about the Soviet Union
Books by W. Cleon Skousen